Quchan County is in Razavi Khorasan province, Iran. The capital of the county is the city of Quchan. Until 2003, Quchan County had three districts: Central, Bajgiran, and Faruj. Faruj District was separated from the county and Faruj County in North Khorasan province was established.

At the 2006 census, the county's population was 179,613 in 45,502 households. The following census in 2011 counted 179,714 people in 51,045 households. At the 2016 census, the county's population was 174,495 in 52,851 households. On 29 December 2019, with the approval of the Board of Ministers, two new districts named Abkuh and Quchan Atiq were created in the county.

Administrative divisions

The population history of Quchan County's administrative divisions over three consecutive censuses is shown in the following table. The latest census shows two districts, five rural districts, and two cities.

References

 

Counties of Razavi Khorasan Province